Njeliyanparambu is a place on the outskirts of the city of Kozhikode in Kerala, India. It is located 6km away from Kozhikode and has gained prominence for being a dumping ground for Kozhikode city.

References

Suburbs of Kozhikode